Dahlia Mokbel (born 25 May 1969) is a former synchronized swimmer from Egypt. She participated in the women's solo and the women's duet at the 1984 Summer Olympics.

References 

1969 births
Living people
Egyptian synchronized swimmers
Olympic synchronized swimmers of Egypt
Synchronized swimmers at the 1984 Summer Olympics